Charles Chadwick (1 March 1880 – 30 October 1942) was a New Zealand cricketer. He played sixteen first-class matches for Otago between 1912 and 1925.

Chadwick was born at Dunedin in 1880. He worked as a bookmaker and also umpired first-class matches. His brother, Leslie Chadwick also played for Otago.

References

External links
 

1880 births
1942 deaths
New Zealand cricketers
Otago cricketers
Cricketers from Dunedin